Darivka, is a village located on the Inhulets River in Kherson Raion, Kherson Oblast, southern Ukraine. It has a population of approximately 2,855 people.

Administrative Status 
Until July 2020, Darivka was in the Bilozerka Raion of Kherson Oblast. The raion was abolished in July 2020 as a result of the administrative reform of Ukraine's districts, which reduced the number of raions in Kherson Oblast to five, merging Bilozerka Raion into Kherson Raion.

Russian Invasion of Ukraine 

During the 2022 Russian Invasion of Ukraine, the village was captured by the Russian forces on 28 February 2022 as a part of the Southern offensive. However, along with the city of Kherson, Darivka was liberated on 11 November 2022 during Ukraine's Kherson counteroffensive.

References 

Villages in Kherson Raion